Anse Galet is a quartier of Terre-de-Haut Island, located in Îles des Saintes archipelago in the Caribbean. It is located in the Southwestern part of the island. 

Populated places in Îles des Saintes
Quartiers of Îles des Saintes